The National Board of Review Award for Best Documentary Feature is one of the annual awards given (since 1940) to the producer of the film by the National Board of Review of Motion Pictures.

Notes
≠ Academy Award for Best Documentary Feature nominee
≈ Academy Award for Best Documentary Feature winner
± Nominated in other Oscar categories
° Emmy winner
× Sundance winner
÷ Academy Award for Best Documentary (Short Subject) winner/nominee
§ National Film Registry inductee

List of winners
 1940: The Fight for Life
 1941: Target for Tonight; The Forgotten Village; Ku Kan; The Land
 1942: Moscow Strikes Back≈; Native Land; Anzacs in Action
 1943: Desert Victory≈; The Battle of Russia≠; Prelude to War≈; Saludos Amigos±; The Silent Village
 1944: Memphis Belle: A Story of a Flying Fortress§; Attack! The Battle for New Britain; With the Marines at Tarawa÷; Battle for the Marianas; Tunisian Victory

1980s

1990s

2000s

2010s

2020s

See also
Golden Globe Award for Best Documentary Film
Critics' Choice Movie Award for Best Documentary Feature
Directors Guild of America Award for Outstanding Directing – Documentaries

References

External links
 National Board of Review at the Internet Movie Database

Lists of films by award
American documentary film awards
Awards established in 1940
1940 establishments in the United States